Carlo Biagi (20 April 1914 – 16 April 1986) was an Italian football player who played as a midfielder.

Career
Biagi played club football for Pisa SC. Biagi competed in the 1936 Summer Olympics, and was a member of the Italy team which won the gold medal in the football tournament.

Honours

International 
Italy
Olympic Gold Medal: 1936

References

External links
profile

1914 births
1986 deaths
Italian footballers
Footballers at the 1936 Summer Olympics
Olympic footballers of Italy
Olympic gold medalists for Italy
Italy international footballers
Serie A players
Pisa S.C. players
A.C. Prato players
S.S.C. Napoli players
People from Viareggio
Olympic medalists in football
Medalists at the 1936 Summer Olympics
Association football midfielders
Footballers from Tuscany
Sportspeople from the Province of Lucca